Govinda Bahadur Neupane is a Nepalese politician who is elected member of Provincial Assembly of Madhesh Province from CPN(Unified Socialist). Neupane, a resident of Surunga Municipality, He is Central Committee Member of NCP (Unified socialist) & Saptari District Incharge  Neupane was elected to the 2017 & 2022 provincial assembly election from Saptari 4(A).He is Province Parliamentary  Leader of CPN(Unified socialist) Madhesh Province Assembly.

Electoral history

2017 Nepalese provincial elections

References

External links

Living people
Members of the Provincial Assembly of Madhesh Province
Madhesi people
People from Saptari District
Communist Party of Nepal (Unified Socialist) politicians
1961 births